Alex Davis is a former association football player who represented New Zealand at international level.

Davis played three official A-international matches for New Zealand in 1952, the first a 2–0 win over Pacific neighbours Fiji on 7 September. His other two official appearances were a 2–2 draw and a 5–3 win over Tahiti on 21 September and 28 September 1952 respectively.

References 

Year of birth missing (living people)
Living people
New Zealand association footballers
New Zealand international footballers
Association football forwards